Marian Lalewicz (21 November 1876 – 21 August 1944) - was a Polish architect and one of the main proponents of Academic classicism in interwar Poland.

Early life and studies
Lalewicz finished school at a gimnazjum in Suwałki in 1895. He then studied architecture at the Academy of Fine Arts in Saint-Petersburg, from which he graduated in 1901. He continued his studies in Sweden, Norway, Germany, Austria and Italy. Until 1917, he taught the history of art and the history of architecture in Saint Petersburg schools, while at the same time designing various buildings in Moscow and Saint Petersburg. After World War I he moved back to newly independent Poland. Between 1925 and 1927 he was the dean of the Architecture Department at the Warsaw Polytechnic, and between 1935 and 1938, he was a rector. He was active in various social organizations dedicated to the preservation of historic buildings.

World War II
After the Nazi invasion of Poland, Lalewicz served as a director of the emergency medical services (Pogotwie Techniczne) during the Siege of Warsaw. Under German occupation he was a teacher at one of the secret universities (all education past primary school for Poles had been banned by the Nazis). He was expelled by the Germans from his home in 1943.

Lalewicz was executed during the Warsaw Uprising by German units, in the Mass murder on Dzika street on August 21, 1944. A symbolic grave was erected after the war at Warsaw's Powązki Cemetery (244-I-29).

Major works

In Poland

In Russia

 The Palace of M.K. Pokotilov in Saint-Petersburg (1909).
 The F.L. Mertens department store building in Saint-Petersburg (1911–1912).
 The tenement house of M.A. Soloveychik in Saint-Petersburg (1911-1913).
 The cinema/theater "Parisiana" in Saint-Petersburg (1913–1914).
 An administrative building for the Russo-American Manufacturing Firm "Treugol’nik" in Moscow (1916).

Awards
Architecture

Other
Commander's Cross of the Order of Polonia Restituta

References

 National Geographic traveler: St. Petersburg

1876 births
1944 deaths
Polish people executed by Nazi Germany
Architects from Warsaw
Art Nouveau architects
People from Vilkaviškis
Lithuanian people executed by Nazi Germany
Warsaw Uprising insurgents
Polish civilians killed in World War II